Timothy F. Callahan (March 1, 1856 – October 22, 1934) was an American politician and businessperson from Maine. Callahan, a Democrat from Lewiston, served one term in the Maine House of Representatives (1891–1892). He also was elected by the Maine Legislature to serve as the third Maine State Auditor (1913–1915).

Callahan's parents, John and Margaret Callahan, were both Irish immigrants. He and his brother Eugene Callahan were merchants. The brothers erected two Renaissance-style commercial buildings in downtown Lewiston; the first in 1892 and the second in 1910–11. They sold trunks, hats and men's clothing.

References

External links

1856 births
1934 deaths
Politicians from Lewiston, Maine
Democratic Party members of the Maine House of Representatives
Maine State Auditors
Businesspeople from Maine